The Other Side of Hope is a 2017 Finnish comedy-drama film written, produced, and directed by Aki Kaurismäki. The film was produced by Kaurismäki's Finnish company Sputnik. In December 2016, it was selected to play in competition at the 67th Berlin International Film Festival. The story is about a Finnish businessman who meets a Syrian asylum-seeker looking for his missing sister. Kaurismäki has noted that this film will be his last as a director.

Plot
In Helsinki, Waldemar, a traveling shirt salesman, quarrels with his wife and leaves her. He decides to leave his business and sells his remaining shirts. He gambles his earnings at a poker game and wins a lot of money. With this, he buys a restaurant. His three employees are initially skeptical of Waldemar's attempts to reinvigorate their restaurant.

At the same time, Khaled, a Syrian, shows up in Helsinki illegally on a cargo ship. He turns himself in to the police and applies for asylum. At the refugee processing facility he's sent to, he befriends Mazdak, an Iraqi refugee. Khaled asks Mazdak to help him with his search for his sister, Miriam, who was lost during their journey through the Balkans for refuge from the Syrian Civil War. When the government denies Khaled's asylum application, he escapes.

Waldemar finds Khaled hiding near his restaurant, gives him refuge, and hires him. Waldemar and his staff help Khaled get new papers. Mazdak eventually hears from Miriam. Waldemar and Khaled hire a trucker to smuggle her from Lithuania, where she was in a refugee facility. Khaled and Miriam reunite. Shortly thereafter, Khaled, while returning to Waldemar's apartment, is harassed by a racist thug who stabs him nearly to death. Waldemar sees pools of blood when he gets home, and goes out to find Khaled sitting under a tree on the bank of a river, smiling as a small dog licks his face.

Cast

Production
Aki Kaurismäki said he set out hoping to change perspectives on refugees in Finland.  Sherwan Haji won the part of Khaled after answering a casting call for a Middle Eastern actor, Syrian preferred.

Haji commented he drew on his personal experiences to play the character, saying "It took me maybe 10 minutes to just close my eyes and think that I'm home, and then all of a sudden it rain bombs". Kaurismäki asked Haji if he played an instrument, and upon finding he did, asked Haji to bring the instrument to the set, writing a scene to incorporate this. After considering the working title The Refugee not poetic, Kaurismäki said he found his title The Other Side of Hope in an ancient Greek poem.

Release

In December 2016, it was announced The Other Side of Hope would play in competition at the 67th Berlin International Film Festival. The film itself was given an early February release in Finland and Curzon Artificial Eye acquired the British distribution rights, with plans to release the film in April 2017. In March 2017, Janus Films acquired the rights to distribute the film in the United States, previously distributing Kaurismäki's preceding film from 2011, Le Havre, in the country as well. The Other Side of Hope was released in the United States on 1 December 2017.

Reception
The Other Side of Hope was highly acclaimed upon release. On Rotten Tomatoes, the film holds a 91% approval rating, based on 87 reviews, with an average score of 7.8/10. The website's critical consensus reads, "Writer-director Aki Kaurismäki further sharpens his craft with The Other Side of Hope, offering a timely drama whose melancholy air is leavened by its empathy." On Metacritic, it holds a score of 84 out of 100 based on 23 reviews, indicating "universal acclaim".

A. O. Scott of The New York Times said the film was "humane and gravely funny" and "at once honest and artful, a touching and clearsighted declaration of faith in people and in movies."

Justin Chang of the Los Angeles Times noted: "Full of brilliantly offhand gags and harrowing plot turns, this delightful comic fable expresses a belief in human decency, in the way things could be if only we all tried a little harder, that feels wise and hopeful rather than naive".

The film was chosen as the best film of 2016–17 by FIPRESCI.

Accolades

References

External links
 
 
 
 
 
 
 
 
 
 Movie-Homepage (Germany)
The Other Side of Hope: No-Home Movie an essay by Girish Shambu at the Criterion Collection

2017 films
2017 comedy-drama films
2010s Finnish-language films
Films directed by Aki Kaurismäki
Films set in Helsinki
Films shot in Finland
Films about refugees
Finnish comedy-drama films
Films set in restaurants
Refugees in Finland